The 2012 Army Black Knights football team represented the United States Military Academy as an independent in the 2012 NCAA Division I FBS football season. The Black Knights were led by fourth-year head coach Rich Ellerson and played their home games at Michie Stadium. They finished the season 2–10.

Schedule

Roster
 PK Eric Osteen
 QB Trent Steelman

Game summaries

at San Diego State

Northern Illinois

at Wake Forest

Stony Brook

Boston College

Kent State

at Eastern Michigan

Ball State

Air Force

at Rutgers

Temple

vs. Navy

References

Army
Army Black Knights football seasons
Army Black Knights football